Primera Hora is a daily newspaper of Puerto Rico.

History
It was established on November 17, 1997, by Carlos Nido and Héctor Olave. Distributed free of charge through a print edition from Monday to Friday, readers can get Primera Hora through subscription, in establishments and at traffic lights throughout the island. Reaching more than 200,000 people with its regionalized distribution, Primerahora.com is also the second most visited local news website in Puerto Rico.

Primera Hora conducted its minor survey on how dancing  to reggaeton music affects youth, specifically young women in Puerto Rico.

References

External links 

Spanish-language newspapers published in Puerto Rico
Newspapers established in 1997
1997 establishments in Puerto Rico